The 2005 Florida State Seminoles football team represented Florida State University during the 2005 NCAA Division I-A football season. The team was coached by Bobby Bowden and played their home games at Doak Campbell Stadium in Tallahassee, Florida. They were members of the Atlantic Coast Conference (ACC) and competed in the Atlantic Division.

The Seminoles won their division and competed in the ACC title game, defeating Virginia Tech in the inaugural championship game.

Recruits
The Seminoles recruiting class was ranked No. 2 in the nation behind only Southern California by Rivals.com, but never panned out. On a reevaluation in 2012, Rivals.com listed it among the most disappointing recruiting classes of the decade.

Schedule

Rankings

Post season

Florida State finished the season ranked number 23 in both the final AP and Coaches college football polls. Florida State's trip to the Orange Bowl marked the 24th consecutive post season bowl game under Bobby Bowden.

NFL draft
Six seniors and two juniors would go on and be drafted in the 2006 NFL Draft.

All-star games

References

Florida State
Florida State Seminoles football seasons
Atlantic Coast Conference football champion seasons
Florida State Seminoles football